Galeomorphii is a superorder of cartilaginous fishes which includes all modern sharks except the dogfish and its relatives. They are sometimes called galea or galean sharks. There are about 300 living species in 23 families. Galean sharks are divided into four orders: the Heterodontiformes, Orectolobiformes, Lamniformes, and Carcharhiniformes

Classification

Order Heterodontiformes

The bullhead sharks are a small order of basal modern sharks (Neoselachii). All are relatively small, with the largest species being just  in adult length. They are bottom feeders in tropical and subtropical waters. They appear in the fossil record in the Early Jurassic, well before any of the other galean sharks.  However, they have never been common, and it is likely their origin lies even further back.

There are nine living species in a single genus, Heterodontus and  a single family.
 Family Heterodontidae (Bullhead sharks)

Order Orectolobiformes

Carpet sharks are another small order of sharks, so called because many members have ornate patterns reminiscent of carpets. Sometimes the term "carpet shark" is used interchangeably with wobbegong, which are a subgroup of the order. Carpet sharks have two dorsal fins, without spines, and a small mouth that is forward of the eyes. Many have barbels and small gill slits, with the fifth slit overlapping the fourth. The upper lobe of the caudal fin tends to be mostly in line with the body, while the lower lobe is poorly developed.

The order has around 43 species in seven families and 13 genera:

 Family Brachaeluridae Applegate (Blind sharks)
 Family Ginglymostomatidae Gill, 1862 (Nurse sharks)
 Family Hemiscylliidae Gill, 1862 (Bamboo sharks)
 Family Orectolobidae Gill, 1896 (Wobbegong sharks)
 Family Parascylliidae Gill, 1862 (Collared carpet sharks)
 Family Rhincodontidae (J. P. Müller & Henle, 1839) (Whale sharks)
 Family Stegostomatidae Gill, 1862 (Zebra sharks)

Order Lamniformes

Mackerel sharks are an order which includes some of the most familiar species of sharks, such as the great white shark, as well as more unusual representatives, such as the goblin shark and the megamouth shark. Members of the order are distinguished by possessing two dorsal fins, an anal fin, five gill slits, eyes without nictitating membranes, and a mouth extending behind the eyes. Mackerel sharks may also refer specifically to the family Lamnidae.

The order includes seven families and sixteen living species:
 Family Alopiidae Bonaparte, 1838 (Thresher sharks)
 Family Cetorhinidae Gill, 1862 (Basking sharks)
 Family Lamnidae J. P. Müller and Henle, 1838
 Family Megachasmidae Taylor, Compagno & Struhsaker, 1983 (Megamouth shark)
 Family Mitsukurinidae D. S. Jordan, 1898
 Family Odontaspididae Müller & Henle, 1839 (Sand sharks)
 Family Pseudocarchariidae Compagno, 1973 (Crocodile shark)
 Family Cretoxyrhinidae (Extinct)
 Family Otodontidae (Extinct)

Order Carcharhiniformes

Ground sharks are the largest order of sharks, and include a number of common types such as the blue shark, catsharks, swellsharks and sandbar sharks. Members of the orders are characterized by the presence of a nictitating membrane over the eye, two dorsal fins, an anal fin, and five gill slits. The families in the order Carcharhiniformes are expected to be revised; recent DNA studies show that some of the traditional groups are not monophyletic.

The order includes eight families and over 270 species:
 Family Carcharhinidae (Requiem sharks)
 Family Hemigaleidae (Weasel sharks)
 Family Leptochariidae (Barbeled houndshark)
 Family Proscylliidae (Finback catsharks)
 Family Pseudotriakidae (False catsharks)
 Family Scyliorhinidae (Catsharks)
 Family Sphyrnidae (Hammerhead sharks)
 Family Triakidae (Houndsharks)

References

External links
 .  Database of bibliography of living/fossil sharks and rays (Chondrichtyes: Selachii) with more than 15.000 listed papers and many download links.
 Superorder Galeomorphii Marine Species Identification Portal. Retrieved 10 February 2017.

Elasmobranchii
Chordate superorders